Ihor Romanovych Kohut (born 7 March 1996) is a Ukrainian professional footballer who plays as a midfielder for Dnipro-1.

Career
Kohut is a product of the FC Dnipro Youth Sportive School System. His first trainers were Ihor Khomenko and Yevhen Kovalenko.

He made his debut for FC Dnipro in the match against FC Volyn Lutsk on 24 July 2016 in the Ukrainian Premier League scoring a header off a cross to make the score 2–0. The game would eventually end 5–0.

Career statistics

References

External links

1996 births
Living people
Footballers from Dnipro
Ukrainian footballers
FC Dnipro players
SC Dnipro-1 players
Ukrainian Premier League players
Ukrainian First League players
Ukrainian Second League players

Association football midfielders
Ukraine youth international footballers